Roger Montgomery was an architect.

Roger (de) Montgomery may also refer to:

Roger Montgomery (sports agent)
Roger de Montgomerie, 1st Earl of Shrewsbury
Roger de Montgomery, seigneur of Montgomery
Roger de Montgomery of Poitou